Sturgis Municipal Airport  is a city-owned public-use airport located  east of the central business district of Sturgis, a city in Meade County, South Dakota, United States. According to the FAA's National Plan of Integrated Airport Systems for 2009–2013, it is categorized as a general aviation facility.

Facilities and aircraft 

For the 12-month period ending December 13, 2016, the airport had 36,000 aircraft operations, an average of 99 per day: 99 percent general aviation and 2 percent air taxi. At that time there were 46 aircraft based at this airport: 92 percent single-engine and 8 percent multi-engine.

References

External links 
 Air Repair, Inc  Aircraft Maintenance  
 Sturgis (49B) at South Dakota DOT Airport Directory
 C & B Aviation, LLC, the fixed-base operator (FBO)
 Aerial image as of 12 June 1995 from USGS The National Map
 
 

Airports in South Dakota
Buildings and structures in Meade County, South Dakota
Transportation in Meade County, South Dakota